Lutheran art consists of all religious art produced for Lutherans and the Lutheran churches. This includes sculpture, painting, and architecture. Artwork in the Lutheran churches arose as a distinct marker of the faith during the Reformation era and attempted to illustrate, supplement and portray in tangible form the teachings of Lutheran theology.

Reformation era 

Martin Luther encouraged the display of some religious imagery in churches, seeing the Evangelical Lutheran Church as a continuation of the "ancient, apostolic church". He defended the use of "importance of images as tools for instruction and aids to devotion", stating that "If it is not a sin but good to have the image of Christ in my heart, why should it be a sin to have it in my eyes?"

His attitude towards images became more positive after his dispute with Andreas Karlstadt began in 1521. Luther had left Karlstadt in effective charge of his church in Wittenberg when he went into retreat in the Wartburg, but Karlstadt introduced a considerably more Radical Reformation than Luther approved, which included the removal of all religious images from churches.  As with the later Calvinist programmes of complete destruction of images, this aroused more popular opposition than other aspects of the radical innovations, and Luther's support for images was in part an attempt to distinguish his positions from more radical ones, as well as an attempt to avoid stirring up opposition over an issue he did not see as central.

Luther also understood the value of crude polemical woodcuts in the propaganda battle, and commissioned some himself.  He also appears to have worked personally with artists to develop didactic compositions that were used as book frontispieces, including for the Luther Bible which had an elaborate frontispiece in all early editions, prints, and relatively small versions in oils. Law and Gospel (1529) by the Lutheran painter Lucas Cranach the Elder is the earliest painting of this type, painted in different versions, and turned into a woodcut.  Several share a similar composition, divided vertically into two by a tree, also found in many polemical prints; typically there is a good side and a bad side. Lutheran catechisms, an important means of disseminating Lutheran teachings among the congregations, were often illustrated with woodcuts, as were prayerbooks and other religious literature.

In the beginning of Lutheranism's spread to German territories in the 1520s and 1530s, local ordinances set out a variety of treatments of existing imagery in churches.  Where, as was sometimes the case, nothing was said, it is presumed that it was intended that many images could be retained. In the Lutheran churches of Nuremberg, for example, "side altars, sacrament houses and saints' shrines provided (and continue to provide) the visual backdrop for evangelical worship". Elsewhere, depending on the views of the ruler or council, all images were to be removed, as in Hesse in 1526, although Martin Luther objected to this decision, apparently ineffectively. Some ordinances specified that only "images near and before which particular worship and idolatry and special honour with candles and lights have been practiced" should be removed but also emphasized that "we may not be iconoclasts", in the words of a Hamburg ordinance of 1529. In Brandenburg, an injunction was pronounced to retain 'altars...images and paintings' and in Württemberg, images that were neglected or damaged were restored or replaced. The Augsburg Interim and Leipzig Interim settled the issue, both pronouncing that sacred art would be preserved in the Lutheran Churches, though they would not be the focal point of worship, thus making the Lutheran position a via media between what Lutheran theologians perceived as 'Roman Catholic idolatry' and 'Calvinist iconoclasm'.

A few Lutheran altarpieces, including those of the Last Supper, were commissioned under the purview of Martin Luther. The Schneeberg Altarpiece was placed at the high altar of St. Wolfgang's Church, Schneeberg and as Lutheran sacred imagery, reflected "the devotional forms of fifteenth- and early sixteenth-century northern art". The Schneeberg Altarpiece (1539), along with the Wittenberg Altarpiece (1547) and the Weimar Altarpiece (1555), were Christocentric in their iconography and "these altarpieces reinforced the key teachings of the new church and helped consolidate a sense of confessional identity." In eastern Germany, Lutheran patrons erected some thirty new altarpieces. Most pre-Reformation altarpieces were preserved within Lutheran churches as the "altar was still believed to be a particularly holy place, and should be adorned accordingly."

Lutheran sacred art gained a new function in addition to exciting one's mind to thoughts of the Divine by also serving a didactic purpose. Cranach's Law and Gospel, for example, "enshrines the specific authority of the word of the Bible by including biblical passages as prominent parts of the composition." Lutheranism was responsible for "an explosion of creativity in the graphic arts" with works such as Passional Christi und Antichristi by Philipp Melanchthon, being described as "richly illustrated".

With respect to the Divine Service, "Lutheran worship became a complex ritual choreography set in a richly furnished church interior."
Ornate church interiors in Lutheran churches reflected Lutheran Eucharistic theology, which taught the real presence of Christ in the Eucharist as a sacramental union. Lutheran churches, as well as homes, displayed a prominent crucifix as it highlighted their high view of the Theology of the Cross. It became a popular devotional image for Lutherans, who "prayed, meditated, and even wept before them." Thus, for Lutherans, "the Reformation renewed rather than removed the religious image."

During the Beeldenstorm or Iconoclastic Fury, bands often categorized as Calvinists violently removed sacred art from churches.  Lutherans generally opposed the iconoclasm, one saying: "You black Calvinist, you give permission to smash our pictures and hack our crosses; we are going to smash you and your Calvinist priests in return". As such, Calvinist iconoclasm, "provoked reactive riots by Lutheran mobs" in Germany. Lutheran theologian and priest Johann Arndt was forced to flee Anhalt when it became Calvinist in the 1580s, due to his defense of Christian sacred art. He wrote a treatise Ikonographia, in which he criticized the Reformed faith for consecrating the Eucharistic elements on wooden tables rather than on stone altars. As Calvinism, along with its associated aniconism spread, "Lutherans responded by reaffirming their commitment to the proper use of religious images."

Baroque period 

Artists who designed Lutheran Baroque art not only took their inspiration from Martin Luther, but from popular Lutheran piety in the latter part of the 16th and 17th centuries. The Dresden Frauenkirche serves as a prominent example of Lutheran Baroque art, which was completed in 1743 after being commissioned by the Lutheran city council of Dresden:

In the second half of the 17th century, High Baroque art continued to spread through Saxony, under the rule of Johann Georg II. Pieces like the altar of Johanneskirche resembled the Descent from the Cross by Peter Paul Rubens.

More typically, Daniel Hisgen (1733-1812) was a German painter of the rococo period who worked as a painter of Lutheran churches in Upper Hesse, specializing on cycles of paintings decorating the front of the gallery parapet in churches with an upper gallery. His discreet cycles demonstrate the modest prominence expected of Lutheran art in German churches of his day, taking a middle route between the large and prominent images in Catholic churches, and the complete absence of images in Calvinist ones.

19th century 

In the Evangelical Lutheran Church in Denmark, several Lutheran altarpieces were designed and housed within parish churches. Many of these were designed by artists such as Carl Bloch and Joakim Skovgaard.

Present day 
With respect to artwork adorning Lutheran churches in the modern era:

In Finland, Hilkka Toivola produced many stained glass works in the 20th century. Within the Evangelical Lutheran Church in Denmark, religious artists including Arne Haugen Sørensen, Peter Brandes, Hein Heinsen and Maja Lisa Engelhardt continue to design Lutheran art today. It has been claimed that more pre-Reformation Marian altarpieces survive in German Lutheran churches than Catholic ones, where many were replaced in the Baroque period.

See also 

Art in the Protestant Reformation and Counter-Reformation
Home altar
Drothem Church

Notes

Works cited 
Heal, Bridget (2017), A Magnificent Faith: Art and Identity in Lutheran Germany, Oxford University Press, 2017, 9780191057540, google books

External links 
50 Reformation artworks - Living Lutheran

 
Christian art